Operation Diamond Racket is a 1978 Indian Kannada-language action spy thriller film produced and directed by the duo Dorai–Bhagavan, starring Rajkumar and Padmapriya. The supporting cast features Chandralekha, Vajramuni, Thoogudeepa Srinivas, Tiger Prabhakar and Fighter Shetty.

The film was the fourth and the last in the CID 999 Franchise created along the lines of the James Bond and James Bond – styled films  following Jedara Bale, Goa Dalli CID 999 and Operation Jackpot Nalli C.I.D 999. The film was re-released in 2013. This is the only colour movie in the franchise and also the only movie in the franchise to not feature Narasimharaju. The movie was dubbed in Hindi in 1983 as Jasoos 999. A fifth movie in the franchise titled Operation Golden Gang was announced but dropped owing to average response to this movie coupled with high budget for the sequel.

The movie was shot in Nepal and became the first Kannada movie to be shot outside India. However, another Kannada movie which released four months later, Singaporenalli Raja Kulla is widely credited as the movie which started the trend of Kannada movies being shot outside India since it was shot in a country which is not an Indian neighbour.

Plot
CID officer Prakash aka CID 999 solves the gold smuggling cases where the CID Chief mentions about increase in diamond smuggling and missing case of top scientists. Prakash traces the lead from his fellow officer Madhu and locates David, the local kingpin. He impersonates as David and traps Lalita, who has the diamonds. Prakash kills David and entrusts Lalita to Madhu. He goes to the hideout warehouse, where David was supposed to drop the diamonds. Prakash finds the diamonds and alerts the police.

Prakash returns, only to find that Lalita escaped and Madhu dead. Meena, Madhu's sister vows vengeance against Madhu's killers. After checking an address in Lalitha's bag, which is located in Kathmandu, Prakash and Meena act as a honeymoon couple and leave for Kathmandu. Monzein, Prakash's friend and fellow-agent helps him with clues about antique shops, which are suspected to be involved in smuggling. Prakash spends quite some time, posing as a tourist, but cannot locate any clues about the smuggling gang. Vishwanath, the kingpin at Kathmandu tries to kill Meena and Prakash repeatedly, but Prakash overpowers him.

Frustrated, he orders his secretary Drenko to befriend Meena. Drenko kills Monzein's entire family and kidnaps Meena. Prakash finds a radar on top of a building at a remote site and finds it to be the secret hide-out and enters by disguising himself as one of the henchman. He observes a speech, where the diamonds are used as a powerful beam to bring down any fighter jet-planes, submarine or military installation. Prakash gets caught and is thrown into a snake cage, along with Meena, leaving them to die. However, Prakash and Meena escape where Prakash overpowers the place, kills all the henchmen and their boss where he frees up Meena and burns down the place using a watch bomb.

Cast 
 Rajkumar as CID 999 Prakash
 Padmapriya as Meena, Madhu's sister
 Vajramuni
 Thoogudeepa Srinivas
 Tiger Prabhakar
 M. B. Shetty (credited as Fighter Shetty)
 Rajanand
 Nithin Kumar
 Shani Mahadevappa
 Chethan Ramrao
 Mamatha Shenoy
 Chandralekha
 Seema Kapoor
 Raji
 Jennifer
 Babbi
 Manzin

Release
The title of the movie created confusion among fans as to whether it was Racket or Rocket.

Soundtrack

The music of the film was composed by G. K. Venkatesh, with lyrics penned by Chi. Udaya Shankar. The song "If You Come Today", sung by Rajkumar became widely popular, as the song was entirely written in unintentionally broken English.

Re-release 
Operation Diamond Racket was re-released across 40 theatres in Karnataka on 31 May 2013. The film received a good opening, having collected  on the opening day in Kapali Theatre, Bangalore.

References

External links 
 

  ( Hindi dubbed version)

1978 films
1970s Kannada-language films
Indian detective films
Films scored by G. K. Venkatesh
1970s spy thriller films
Indian spy thriller films
Films directed by Dorai–Bhagavan